Kentish Town South is a ward in the London Borough of Camden, in the United Kingdom. The ward will represent the southern part of Kentish Town. The ward will first be used for the 2022 Camden London Borough Council election, and will elect three councillors to Camden London Borough Council. Its area was previously in the Cantelowes and Kentish Town wards, which will be abolished at the same time. In 2018, the ward had an electorate of 7,841. The Boundary Commission projects the electorate to rise to 8,750 in 2025.

Election results

Elections in the 2020s

References

Wards of the London Borough of Camden
Kentish Town
2022 establishments in England